Jacobo Montvelisky (born November 5, 1988) is a Costa Rican photographer and entrepreneur, whose style is marked by and best known for his work in fine art photography and landscape photography. His photographic work focuses on capturing and preserving moments with valuable historical connotation. Montvelisky currently works between San José and Panama City as the CEO for a Digital Agency.

Major Exhibitions
Panamá: Allegro Gallery / Museum of Contemporary Art (Panamá): “Route 66". 2014.

References

External links
 Jacobo Montvelisky | Official Website
 Jacobo Montvelisky's profile on Artfinder
 FotoSeptiembre Panamá 2014
 Talento tico expone en Panamá

1988 births
Living people
People from San José, Costa Rica
Landscape photographers
Costa Rican photographers